National Security Authority (NBÚ) is a Czech government agency responsible for maintaining security clearances, protection of classified information and cyber security of the Czech Republic. NBÚ is also charged with protection of the Czech government communications and information systems against penetration and network warfare.

Government agencies of the Czech Republic
Organizations established in 1998